Solomon Namliit Boar (born July 15, 1968) is a Ghanaian politician and a Member of Parliament of the Parliament of Ghana. He is a member of the New Patriotic Party and a Former Regional Minister of the newly created North East Region of Ghana.

Political life 
In March 2017, President Nana Akufo-Addo named Boar one of the ten deputy regional ministers who would form part of his government. He was vetted by the Appointments Committee of the Parliament of Ghana in the same month. He was approved by the committee and his name was forwarded to Speaker of Parliament for further approval by the general house of parliament.

Personal life 
Boar is a Christian (Baptist). He is married (with five children).

Early life and education 
Boar was born on July 15, 1968. He hails from Bunkpurugu, a town in the Northern Region of Ghana. He entered University of Cape Coast, Ghana and obtained his Bachelor of Arts degree in management studies in 2007. He also attended Kwame Nkrumah University of Science and Technology and obtained his Executive Master of Business Administration (CEMBA) degree in 2012.

Employment 
 Finance and Administrative Manager, New Energy, Tamale
 Manager/administrator/HR practitioner

References

Living people
New Patriotic Party politicians
Ghanaian MPs 2017–2021
Ghanaian MPs 2021–2025
1968 births
Tamale Senior High School alumni